Cheung Tsing Tunnel, also spelled Cheung Ching Tunnel, is a dual tube 3-lane tunnel on Tsing Yi Island, Hong Kong. It is part of Route 3. Its east end connects to Cheung Tsing Bridge and west Cheung Tsing Highway. The tunnel was opened on 22 May 1997 and is the second toll-free tunnel in Hong Kong. Its length is about 1.6 kilometres.

Construction
The tunnel was given the name "Cheung Ching" (長青) because it is beneath Cheung Ching Estate, the first public housing estate on the island.

Construction through the granite of Tsing Yi Peak required explosives to get through the hardness of the hill. To prevent dislodging of rocks and buildings on the surface slopes the rocks were reinforced by concrete and steel. Although the tunnel used explosives in its construction, boring was more used as the primary digging procedure.

Construction commenced in May 1993 and was completed in January 1997.

Management
The tunnel was managed by Tsing Ma Management Limited under Tsing Ma Control Area, along with Tsing Ma Bridge, Kap Shui Mun Bridge, Ting Kau Bridge, Rambler Channel Bridge, North Lantau Highway and Tsing Kwai Highway.

The traffic of the tunnel is monitored in the buildings at both end, namely East Portal and West Portal Buildings.

References

External links

A brief introduction by Tsing Ma Management Limited

 
Tsing Yi
Road tunnels in Hong Kong
Tunnels completed in 1997
1997 establishments in Hong Kong